Clint Eastwood (born 1930) is an American filmmaker and actor. 

Clint Eastwood may also refer to:

Clint Eastwood (album), an album by The Upsetters
Clint Eastwood (musician), Jamaican reggae deejay
"Clint Eastwood" (song), a song by Gorillaz
"Clint Eastwood", an alias used by Marty McFly in the film Back to the Future Part III

Eastwood, Clint